Christopher John Gordon (born 1956) is an English-born Australian composer and politician best known for his film scores, but has also received major classical commissions. His film scores include, Ladies in Black (2018), Mao's Last Dancer (2009), Master and Commander: The Far Side of the World (2003) and On the Beach (2000).

In 2016, Gordon ran for the Arts Party in the City of Ryde based seat of Bennelong, achieving 1.08% of the vote.

In 2017, he was elected as councillor on the East Ward of the City of Ryde for the Greens and was chosen as deputy mayor, serving a single term in 2017-2018. Gordon sought re-election for a second term on Council on 4 December 2021, but was unsuccessful.

Awards and nominations 
Gordon has won national awards for composition, both in Australia and overseas.

|-
| 1998 || Moby Dick (Christopher Gordon) || APRA Awards: Best Television Theme  || 
|-
| rowspan="3"| 2000 || rowspan="3"| On the Beach (Gordon) || Australian Screen Music Awards: Best Music for a Mini-Series or Telemovie || 
|-
| Australian Screen Music Awards: Best Original Title Theme for a Series, Serial or Mini-Series || 
|-
| Australian Screen Music Awards: Best Soundtrack Album || 
|-
| 2001 || When Good Ghouls Go Bad (Gordon) ||  Australian Screen Music Awards: Best Music for a Mini-Series or Telemovie || 
|-
| 2004 || Master and Commander: The Far Side of the World (Gordon, Iva Davies, Richard Tognetti || ASCAP Awards: Top Box Office Films || 
|-
| 2005 || Salem's Lot (Gordon, Lisa Gerrard) || Primetime Emmy Nomination: Outstanding Music Composition for a Miniseries, Movie or a Special (Dramatic Underscore) || 
|-
| 2009 || Mao's Last Dancer (Gordon) ||  AFI Awards: Best Music Score || 
|-
| 2010 || Mao's Last Dancer (Gordon) ||  ARIA Award for Best Original Soundtrack, Cast or Show Album|| 
|-
|2018 || Ladies in Black ((Gordon) || AACTA Awards: Best Original Score || 
|-

Film scores
 Ladies in Black (2018)
 Adore (2013)
 Crawl (2011)
 Mao's Last Dancer (2009)
 Daybreakers (2009)
 Master and Commander: The Far Side of the World (2003)
 On the Beach (2000)
 Sydney – A Story of a City (2000)
 Moby Dick (1998)

External links
 Gordon, Gross and Dallwitz conquer Music Awards
 APRA Interview
 Colonne Sonore Interview
 
 Australian Music Centre Biography
 ASCAP Interview Christopher Gordon Holds Screening and Q&A Session for Mao's Last Dancer
 Official Site
 Councillors Clr Christopher Gordon City of Ryde

References

20th-century classical composers
APRA Award winners
New South Wales local councillors
Australian film score composers
Australian Greens politicians
Deputy mayors of places in Australia
Male film score composers
20th-century Australian male musicians
20th-century Australian musicians
Varèse Sarabande Records artists
Living people
1956 births